South Xueyuan Road Subdistrict (literally 'South College Road Subdistrict') is a township-level division of Lunan District, Tangshan, Hebei, China.

See also
List of township-level divisions of Hebei

References

Township-level divisions of Hebei